Rezayi (also Romanized as Rez̤āyī) is a village in Band-e Zarak Rural District, in the Central District of Minab County, Hormozgan Province, Iran. At the 2006 census, its population was 35, in 8 families.

References 

Populated places in Minab County